Otišani is a village in the municipality of Debar, North Macedonia.

Demographics
Otišani (Hotishani) is attested in the Ottoman defter of 1467 as a village in the timar of Hizir Muriqi (possibly, Maziqi or Mazhiqi) in the vilayet of Dulgoberda. The village had a total of five households and the anthroponyms recorded depict a mixed Albanian-Slavic character, for example, among the household heads a certain Gjergj Karlovići is attested.     
 
Otišani has traditionally been inhabited by a Muslim Macedonian (Torbeš) population.

According to the 2002 census, the village had a total of 530 inhabitants. Ethnic groups in the village include:

Macedonians 302
Turks 170
Albanians 46
Others 12

References

External links

Villages in Debar Municipality
Macedonian Muslim villages